LGBT history in the United States spans the contributions and struggles of lesbian, gay, bisexual, and transgender (LGBT) people, as well as the LGBT social movements they have built.

17th–18th century

Colonial life 
Colonies in the early 1600s were established with Puritan or Christian norms. These norms included the traditional heterosexual family structure with a man and a woman. This led to the criminalization of homosexuality, or sodomy, in the early colonies

Sodomy in the early colonies 

Documented executions for sodomy began in 1624 with Richard Cornish, a member of the Virginia Colony. Influenced by Puritan beliefs and values, the Massachusetts Bay General Court was the first to officially outlaw sodomy in 1631. The first (documented) conviction for lesbian behavior in America took place in 1649 with the arrest and execution of Sarah White Norman and Mary Vincent Hammon. In 1714 Sodomy laws were established across the early colonies and in the colonial militia; the laws were not abolished until 1925.

19th century 
Noah Webster published the original Webster's American Dictionary of the English Language in 1828. He included several LGBT terms in his book; focusing on terms for gay sexual practices and ignoring lesbian sexual practices: bugger, buggery, pathic, pederast, pederastic, pederasty, sodomy, and sodomite. He occasionally cited the King James Version. For example, Webster cited First Epistle to the Corinthians VI to define the homosexual context of the term abuser. Another citation is the Book of Genesis 18 to associate the term, cry to the Sodom and Gomorrah. One of the first public advocates for gay rights in America was the Presbyterian pastor Carl Schlegel.

Figures 
Both American presidents James Buchanan and his successor Abraham Lincoln were speculated to be homosexual. The sexuality of Abraham Lincoln has been considered for over a century. Perhaps the greatest proof to connect Lincoln and homosexuality is a poem that he wrote in his youth that reads: "But Billy has married a boy".

LGBT persons were present throughout the post-independence history of the country, with gay men having served in the Union Army during the American Civil War. 

The United States saw the rise of its own Uranian poetry after the Uranian ("Urnings") movement began to rise in the Western world. Walt Whitman denied his homosexuality in a letter after asked outright about his sexual orientation by John Addington Symonds. Bayard Taylor wrote Joseph and His Friend: A Story of Pennsylvania in 1870. Archibald Clavering Gunter wrote a lesbian story in 1896 that would serve for the 1914 film, "A Florida Enchantment."

Nineteenth-century Vermont residents Charity Bryant and Sylvia Drake, documented by Rachel Hope Cleves in her 2014 book Charity and Sylvia: A Same-Sex Marriage in Early America,

Susan Lee Johnson included the story of Jason Chamberlain and John Chaffee, a California couple who were together for over 50 years until Chaffee's death in 1903, in her 2000 book Roaring Camp: The Social World of the California Gold Rush.

Around 1890, former acting First Lady Rose Cleveland started a lesbian relationship with Evangeline Marrs Simpson, with explicit erotic correspondence; this cooled when Evangeline married Henry Benjamin Whipple, but after his death in 1901 the two rekindled their relationship and in 1910 they moved to Italy together.

Henry Oliver Walker was permitted in 1898 to paint a mural in the Library of Congress. What the eccentric artist painted was shocking to pious sympathies: a mural of the catamite Ganymede with Zeus in the depiction of an eagle, which was derived from Greek mythology.

William Dorsey Swann 
William Dorsey Swann was the first person to describe himself as a drag queen. Swann was the first American on record who pursued legal and political action to defend the LGBTQ community's right to assemble. During the 1880s and 1890s, Swann organized a series of drag balls in Washington, D.C. Swann was arrested in police raids numerous times, including in the first documented case of arrests for female impersonation in the United States, on April 12, 1888.

Legislation 
Restrictions against loitering and solicitation of sex in public places were installed in the late 19th century by many states (namely to target, among other things, solicitation for same-sex sexual favors), and increasingly tighter restrictions upon "perverts" were common by the turn of the century.  Sodomy laws in the United States were enacted separately over the course of four centuries and varied state by state.

1900–1969 

In the United States, as early as the turn of the 20th century, several groups worked in hiding to avoid persecution and to advance the rights of homosexuals, but little is known about them. Edward Irenaeus Prime-Stevenson published Imre: A Memorandum in 1906 and The Intersexes in 1908. A better documented group is Henry Gerber's Society for Human Rights (formed in Chicago in 1924), which was quickly suppressed within months of its establishment. Serving as an enlisted man in occupied Germany after World War I, Gerber had learned of Magnus Hirschfeld's pioneering work. Upon returning to the U.S. and settling in Chicago, Gerber organized the first documented public homosexual organization in America and published two issues of the first gay publication, entitled Friendship and Freedom. Meanwhile, during the 1920s, LGBT persons found employment as entertainers or entertainment assistants for various urban venues in cities such as New York City.

Homosexuals were occasionally seen in LGBT films of Pre-Code Hollywood. Buster Keaton's Seven Chances offered a rare joke about the female impersonator, Julian Eltinge. The Pansy Craze offered actors, such as Gene Malin, Ray Bourbon, Billy De Wolfe, Joe Besser, and Karyl Norman. In 1927, Mae West was jailed for The Drag. The craze found itself in a wide variety of American films, from gangster films like The Public Enemy, to musicals like Wonder Bar and animated cartoons like Dizzy Red Riding Hood. Homosexuals even managed to find themselves in the then-illegal pornographic film industry.

Around 1929, The Surprise of a Knight became the first American gay pornographic film. A Stiff Game would be the second American gay pornographic film.

Homosexuality was also present in the music industry. In 1922, Norval Bertrand Langworthy (better known as Speed Langworthy) (b. May 15, 1901, Seward, Nebraska - d. March 22, 1999, Arizona) wrote the song, We Men Must Grow a Mustache; Abe Lyman appeared on the sheet music. Edgar Leslie and James V. Monaco wrote Masculine Women, Feminine Men in Hugh J. Ward's 1926 production of the musical Lady Be Good. Homosexuality also found its way into African-American music. Ma Rainey, who is believed to be a lesbian, recorded the song, Prove it on Me Blues. According to pbs.org, the song is about her arrest for group sex, in which alleged lesbianism occurred. George Hannah decided in 1930 to record the song, The Boy in the Boat." Kokomo Arnold recorded the song, "Sissy Man Blues" in 1935. Pinewood Tom (Josh White), George Noble, and Connie McLean's Rhythm Boys followed with their own records.

While it seems that homosexuals enjoyed greater recognition in the media after World War I, many were still arrested and convicted for their deeds through state sodomy laws. For example, Eva Kotchever headed a lesbian café called Eve's Hangout in Greenwich Village. It was stated about her business that "men are admitted but not welcome." Kotchever's discretion had been so reckless that she wrote about lesbianism in her book, Lesbian Love. In 1926, the New York City Police Department raided her club, and Kotchever was arrested on an obscenity charge and deported to her native Poland.
		 	
In 1948, Sexual Behavior in the Human Male was published by Alfred Kinsey, a work which was one of the first to look scientifically at the subject of sexuality. Kinsey claimed that approximately 10% of the adult male population (and about half that number among females) were predominantly or exclusively homosexual for at least three years of their lives.

During the late 1940s through the 1960s, a handful of radio and television news programs aired episodes that focused on homosexuality, with some television movies and network series episodes featuring gay characters or themes. The homophile movement began in the 1950s and 60s with the creation of several organizations, including the Mattachine Society, the Daughters of Bilitis and the Society for Individual Rights. 
 		 	
In 1958, the United States Supreme Court ruled that the gay publication ONE, Inc., was not obscene and thus protected by the First Amendment. The California Supreme Court extended similar protection to Kenneth Anger's homoerotic film, Fireworks and Illinois became the first state to decriminalize sodomy between consenting adults in private.
	
Little change in the laws or mores of society was seen until the mid-1960s, when the sexual revolution began. Gay pulp fiction and Lesbian pulp fiction ushered in a new era. The physique movement also emerged with Mr. America. Athletic Model Guild produced much of the homoerotic content that proceeded the gay pornography business. This was a time of major social upheaval in many social areas, including views of gender roles and human sexuality.

1969–1999

Gay Liberation 

 
 	
In the late 1960s, "liberation" philosophy had started to create different factions within the Civil Rights Movement, Black Power movement, anti-war movement, and feminist movement, also engulfed the homophile movement. A new generation of young gay and lesbian Americans saw their struggle within a broader movement to dismantle racism, sexism, western imperialism, and traditional mores regarding drugs and sexuality. This new perspective on Gay Liberation had a major turning point with the Stonewall riots in 1969.
 		 
In the early hours of June 28, 1969, the police raided a gay/transgender bar known as the Stonewall Inn in Greenwich Village, Manhattan, a common police practice at the time. This type of raid, which was often conducted during city elections, witnessed a new development as some of the patrons in the bar began actively resisting the police arrests. Some of what followed is in dispute, but what is not in dispute is that for the first time, a large group of LGBT Americans who had previously had little or no involvement with the organized gay rights movement rioted for three days against police harassment and brutality. These new activists were angry activists who confronted the police and distributed flyers attacking the Mafia control of the gay bars and the various anti-vice laws that allowed the police to harass gay men and gay drinking establishments. This second wave of the gay rights movement is often referred to as the Gay Liberation movement to draw a distinction from the previous homophile movement.
 			
New gay liberation organizations were created, such as the Gay Liberation Front (GLF) in New York City and the Gay Activists Alliance (GAA). In keeping with the mass frustration of LGBT people, and the adoption of the socialistic philosophies that were being propagated in the late 1960s–1970s, these new organizations engaged in colorful and outrageous street theater (Gallagher & Bull 1996). The GLF published "A Gay Manifesto," which was influenced by Paul Goodman's work titled "The Politics of Being Queer" (1969).
 	
The gay liberation movement spread to countries worldwide and heavily influenced many of the modern LGBT rights organizations. Out of this vein, several modern-day advocacy organizations were established with differing approaches: the Human Rights Campaign, formed in 1980, follows a more middle-class-oriented and reformist tradition, while other organizations such as the National Gay and Lesbian Task Force (NGLTF), formed in 1973, tries to be grassroots-oriented and support local and state groups to create change from the ground up.
 
The group Dyketactics was the first LGBT group in the U.S. to take the police to court for police brutality in the case Dyketactics vs. The City of Philadelphia. Members of Dyketactics who took the police to court, now known as "The Dyketactics Six," were beaten by the Philadelphia Civil Defence Squad in a demonstration for LGBT rights on December 4, 1975. Thomas Szasz was one of the earliest scholars to challenge the idea of homosexuality as a mental disorder. In his book Ceremonial Chemistry (1973), he claimed that the same persecution that targeted witches, Jews, Romani, and homosexuals now targeted "drug addicts" and "insane" people.

Late in 1979, a new religious revival among conservative Evangelical Protestants and Roman Catholics ushered in the Republican coalition politically aligned with the Christian right that would reign in the United States between the years 1970s and 1980s, becoming another obstacle for the progress of the LGBTQ rights movement. During the HIV/AIDS epidemic of the 1980s, LGBTQ communities were further stigmatized as they became the focus of mass hysteria, suffered isolation and marginalization, and were targeted with extreme acts of violence.

Gay migration 
In the 1970s many gay people moved to cities such as San Francisco. Harvey Milk, a gay man, was elected to the city's Board of Supervisors, a legislative chamber often known as a city council in other municipalities. Milk was assassinated in 1978 along with the city's mayor, George Moscone. The White Night Riot on May 21, 1979 was a reaction to the manslaughter conviction and sentence given to the assassin, Dan White, which were thought to be too lenient. Milk played an important role in the gay migration and the gay rights movement.		 
	
The first national gay rights march in the United States took place on October 14, 1979 in Washington, D.C., involving perhaps as many as 100,000 people.
		 	
Historian William A. Percy considers that a third epoch of the gay rights movement began in the early 1980s, when AIDS received the highest priority and decimated its leaders, and lasted until 1998, when advanced antiretroviral therapy greatly extended the life expectancy of those with AIDS in developed countries. It was during this era that direct action groups such as ACT UP were formed.

Decriminalization of sexual activity 
In 1962 Illinois was the first state in the United States to decriminalize private consensual sexual activity in same-sex couples. Although decriminalization of sexual relations was an important step, it was insufficient to guarantee full equality in other areas of life such as a right to life without discrimination.

Over the next several decades, laws prohibiting homosexual acts were repealed on a state-by-state basis. Connecticut was the next state to decriminalize homosexuality. Colorado, Oregon, Delaware, and Hawaii had decriminalized homosexuality by 1973. Ohio, Massachusetts, North Dakota, New Mexico, New Hampshire, California, West Virginia, Iowa, Maine, Indiana, South Dakota, Wyoming, Nebraska, Washington, New York decriminalized homosexuality in the 1970s; in the 1980s, Pennsylvania and Wisconsin. followed suit.

In 1990 Mica England sued the Dallas Police Department for discrimination, and in 1994 overturned its hiring policy. Mica England vs State of Texas, City of Dallas, and Police Chief Mack Vines. This had a statewide effect on state government employment. The Mica England Lawsuit also overturned the Homosexual Conduct Law in 34 counties in the First District Court of Appeal and the Third District Court of Appeal. A late appeal by the Dallas city Attorney at the State Supreme Court level prevented the Supreme Court from ruling for the whole state of Texas. Otherwise, the 21.06 statute would have been overturned statewide. The Mica England case is referred to and is used for discovery in current discrimination lawsuits.

In the 1990s, Kentucky, Nevada, Tennessee, Montana, Rhode Island.

In 2003, the Supreme Court decriminalized homosexuality in Lawrence v. Texas, overturning laws in Alabama, Florida, Idaho, Kansas, Louisiana, Michigan, Mississippi, Missouri, North Carolina, Oklahoma, South Carolina, Texas, Utah, and Virginia.

"Don't ask, don't tell" and DOMA
The long-standing prohibition of gays serving openly in the United States military was reinforced under "Don't ask, don't tell" (DADT), a 1993 Congressional policy that allowed for homosexual people to serve in the military provided that they did not disclose their sexual orientation. The Defense of Marriage Act (DOMA) of 1996 barred the federal government from recognizing same-sex couples in any legal manner.

21st century
The tipping point of activism in favor of same-sex marriage came in 2008 when the California State Supreme Court ruled that the previous proposition which barred the legalization of same-sex marriage in California was unconstitutional under the United States Constitution. Over 18,000 couples then obtained legal licenses from May until November of the same year, when another statewide proposition reinstated the ban on same-sex marriage. This was received by nationwide protests against the ban and several legal battles which were projected to end up in the Supreme Court of the United States. 		 	

In the late 2000s and early 2010s, attention was also paid to the rise of suicides and the lack of self-esteem by LGBT children and teenagers due to homophobic bullying. The "It Gets Better Project", founded and promoted by Dan Savage, was launched to counter the phenomenon, and various initiatives were taken by both activists and politicians to impose better conditions for LGBT students in public schools.
 		 		
On June 12, 2016, 49 people, mostly of Latino descent, were shot and killed by Omar Mateen during Latin Night at the Pulse gay nightclub in Orlando, Florida. The shooting was the second deadliest mass shooting and worst act of violence against the LGBT community in American history. Mateen was a frequent visitor to Pulse. People who knew Mateen have speculated if he could be gay or bisexual himself. A colleague at the police academy in 2006 said he frequented gay clubs with Mateen and that on several occasions, he expressed interest in having sex. People who frequent clubs also remember Mateen dancing with other men. His ex-wife, Sitora Yusufiy, declared three days after the shooting that Mateen might have been hiding homosexuality from his family.

Presidency of Barack Obama

The election of Barack Obama as the first African-American president of the United States (on the same day as the California ban on same-sex marriage was enacted) signified the beginning of a more nuanced federal policy to LGBT citizens. Obama advocated for the repeal of DADT, which was passed in December 2010, and also withdrew legal defense of DOMA in 2011, despite Republican opposition. The Matthew Shepard and James Byrd, Jr. Hate Crimes Prevention Act of 2010 was also the first major hate crimes legislation in federal legislation history to recognize gender identity as a protected class.

2009
President Barack Obama took many definitive pro-LGBT rights stances. In 2009, his administration reversed Bush administration policy and signed the U.N. declaration that calls for the decriminalization of homosexuality. In June 2009, Obama became the first president to declare the month of June to be LGBT pride month; President Clinton had declared June Gay and Lesbian Pride Month. Obama did so again in June 2010, June 2011, June 2012, June 2013, June 2014, and June 2015.

On June 17, 2009, President Obama signed a presidential memorandum allowing same-sex partners of federal employees to receive certain benefits. The memorandum does not cover full health coverage. On October 28, 2009, Obama signed the Matthew Shepard and James Byrd, Jr. Hate Crimes Prevention Act, which added gender, sexual orientation, gender identity, and disability to the federal hate crimes law.

In October 2009, he nominated Sharon Lubinski to become the first openly lesbian U.S. marshal to serve the Minnesota district.

2010

On January 4, 2010, he appointed Amanda Simpson the Senior Technical Advisor to the Department of Commerce, making her the first openly transgender person appointed to a government post by a U.S. President. He had appointed the most U.S. gay and lesbian officials of any U.S. president, at the time.

At the start of 2010, the Obama administration included gender identity among the classes protected against discrimination under the authority of the Equal Employment Opportunity Commission (EEOC). On April 15, 2010, Obama issued an executive order to the Department of Health and Human Services that required medical facilities to grant visitation and medical decision-making rights to same-sex couples. In June 2010, he expanded the Family Medical Leave Act to cover employees taking unpaid leave to care for the children of same-sex partners. On December 22, 2010, Obama signed the Don't Ask, Don't Tell Repeal Act of 2010 into law.

2011
On February 23, 2011, President Obama instructed the Justice Department to stop defending the Defense of Marriage Act in court.

In March 2011, the U.S. issued a nonbinding declaration in favor of gay rights that gained the support of more than 80 countries at the U.N. In June 2011, the U.N. endorsed the rights of gay, lesbian, and transgender people for the first time, by passing a resolution that was backed by the U.S., among other countries.

On August 18, 2011, the Obama administration announced that it would suspend deportation proceedings against many undocumented immigrants who pose no threat to national security or public safety, with the White House interpreting the term "family" to include partners of lesbian, gay and bisexual people.

On September 30, 2011, the Defense Department issued new guidelines that allow military chaplains to officiate at same-sex weddings, on or off military installations, in states where such weddings are allowed.

On December 5, 2011, the Obama administration announced the United States would use all the tools of American diplomacy, including the potent enticement of foreign aid, to promote LGBT rights around the world.

2012
In March and April 2012, Obama expressed his opposition to state constitutional bans on same-sex marriage in North Carolina, and Minnesota.

On May 3, 2012, the Federal Bureau of Prisons has agreed to add an LGBT representative to the diversity program at each of the 120 prisons it operates in the United States.

On May 9, 2012, Obama publicly supported same-sex marriage, the first sitting U.S. President to do so. Obama told an interviewer that:

In the 2012 election, Obama received the endorsement of the following gay rights organizations: Equal Rights Washington, Fair Wisconsin, Gay-Straight Alliance, Human Rights Campaign, and the National Stonewall Democrats. The American Civil Liberties Union (ACLU) gave Obama a score of 100% on the issue of gays and lesbians in the US military and a score of 75% on the issue of freedom to marry for gay people.

2013
On January 7, 2013, the Pentagon agreed to pay full separation pay to service members discharged under "Don't Ask, Don't Tell."

Obama also called for full equality during his second inaugural address on January 21, 2013: "Our journey is not complete until our gay brothers and sisters are treated like anyone else under the law—for if we are truly created equal, then surely the love we commit to one another must be equal as well." It was the first mention of rights for gays and lesbians or use of the word gay in an inaugural address.

On March 1, 2013, Obama, speaking about Hollingsworth v. Perry, the U.S. Supreme Court case about Proposition 8, said "When the Supreme Court asks do you think that the California law, which doesn't provide any rationale for discriminating against same-sex couples other than just the notion that, well, they're same-sex couples—if the Supreme Court asks me or my attorney general or solicitor general, 'Do we think that meets constitutional muster?' I felt it was important for us to answer that question honestly. And the answer is no." The administration took the position that the Supreme Court should apply "heightened scrutiny" to California's ban—a standard under which legal experts say no state ban could survive.

On June 26, 2013, The Supreme Court invalidated The Defense of Marriage Act (DOMA), which prohibited federal recognition of same-sex marriages, in United States v. Windsor.

On August 7, 2013, Obama criticized Russia's anti-gay law.

On December 26, 2013, President Obama signed the National Defense Authorization Act for Fiscal Year 2014 into law, which repealed the ban on consensual sodomy in the UCMJ.

2014
On February 16, 2014, Obama criticized Uganda's anti-gay law.

On February 28, 2014, Obama agreed with Governor Jan Brewer's veto of SB 1062.

Obama included openly gay athletes in the February 2014 Olympic delegation, namely Brian Boitano and Billie Jean King (who was replaced by Caitlin Cahow, who was also openly gay.) This was done in criticism of Russia's anti-gay law.

On July 21, 2014, President Obama signed Executive Order 13672, adding "gender identity" to the categories protected against discrimination in hiring in the federal civilian workforce and both "sexual orientation" and gender identity" to the categories protected against discrimination in hiring and employment on the part of federal government contractors and sub-contractors.

Obama was also criticized for meeting with the anti-gay Ugandan president Yoweri Museveni at a dinner with African heads of state in August 2014.

Later in August 2014 Obama made a surprise video appearance at the opening ceremony of the 2014 Gay Games.

2015

On February 10, 2015, David Axelrod's Believer: My Forty Years in Politics was published. In the book, Axelrod revealed that President Barack Obama lied about his opposition to same-sex marriage for religious reasons in 2008 United States presidential election. "I'm just not very good at bullshitting," Obama told Axelrod, after an event where he stated his opposition to same-sex marriage, according to the book.

On June 26, 2015 the U.S. Supreme Court struck down all state bans on same-sex marriage, legalized it in all fifty states, and required states to honor out-of-state same-sex marriage licenses in the case Obergefell v. Hodges.

In 2015 the United States appointed Randy Berry as its first Special Envoy for the Human Rights of LGBT Persons.

Also in 2015 the Obama administration announced it had opened a gender-neutral bathroom within the White House complex; the bathroom is in the Eisenhower Executive Office Building, next door to the West Wing.

Also in 2015, President Obama responded to a petition seeking to ban conversion therapy (inspired by the death of Leelah Alcorn) with a pledge to advocate for such a ban.

Also in 2015, when President Obama declared May to be National Foster Care Month, he included words never before included in a White House proclamation about adoption, stating in part, "With so many children waiting for loving homes, it is important to ensure all qualified caregivers have the opportunity to serve as foster or adoptive parents, regardless of race, religion, sexual orientation, gender identity, or marital status. That is why we are working to break down the barriers that exist and investing in efforts to recruit more qualified parents for children in foster care." Thus it appears he is the first president to explicitly say gender identity should not prevent anyone from adopting or becoming a foster parent.

On October 29, 2015, President Barack Obama endorsed Proposition 1. Subsequently on November 10, 2015, President Barack Obama officially announced his support for the Equality Act of 2015.

2016

In June 2016, President Obama dedicated the new Stonewall National Monument in Greenwich Village, Lower Manhattan, as the first U.S. National Monument to honor the LGBT rights movement.

On October 20, President Obama endorsed Kate Brown as Governor of Oregon. On November 8, Brown, who is bisexual, became the United States' first openly LGBT person elected Governor. She has also come out as a sexual assault survivor. She assumed office in 2015 due to a resignation. During her tenure as Governor before her election, she signed legislation to ban conversion therapy on minors.

Presidential transition of Donald Trump
During the 2016 Republican National Convention Donald Trump said "As your president, I will do everything in my power to protect our LGBTQ citizens, from the violence and oppression of hateful foreign ideologies". At a campaign rally on October 29, 2016, Trump held up a Rainbow Flag on stage upside down marked with "LGBTs for Trump". On November 11, 2016, Trump appointed Peter Theil to the executive committee of his presidential transition team. On November 13, 2016, during an interview with Lesley Stahl on 60 Minutes, Trump said that he was fine with the Obergefell v. Hodges Supreme Court decision and that it was irrelevant whether he supported same-sex marriage or not because the law was settled. Trump's decisions as president have put into question the sincerity of his comments as a candidate. On October 13, 2017, Trump became the first sitting president to address the Values Voter Summit, an annual conference sponsored by the Family Research Council, which is known for its anti-LGBT civil rights advocacy.

2020
In 2020, the coronavirus pandemic in the United States led to cancellation of most pride parades across the United States during the traditional pride month of June. However, Brooklyn Liberation March, the largest transgender-rights demonstration in LGBTQ history, took place on June 14, 2020 stretching from Grand Army Plaza to Fort Greene, Brooklyn, focused on supporting Black transgender lives. It drew an estimated 15,000 to 20,000 participants.

In Bostock v. Clayton County, a landmark decision, the Supreme Court ruled that Title VII of the Civil Rights Act of 1964 protects employees against discrimination on account of their sexual orientation or gender identity.

Presidency of Joe Biden

2021
On 20 January 2021, Joe Biden took office as the 46th President of the United States. Pete Buttigieg (openly gay, a Democrat and the former Mayor of South Bend) took office as the 19th Secretary of Transportation on 3 February 2021. His nomination was confirmed on February 2, 2021 by a vote of 86–13, making him the first openly LGBT Cabinet member in U.S. history. Nominated at age 38, he is also the youngest Cabinet secretary in the Biden administration and the youngest person ever to serve as Secretary of Transportation.

In 2022, to prevent the loss of the right to same-sex marriage, the United States House of Representatives passed the Respect for Marriage Act which would nullify DOMA and protect both same-sex and interracial marriages. In July 2022, the bill passed 267–157, with 47 Republican representatives joining the Democrats. In December 2022, the United States Senate passed the bill 61–36, and the House again voted 258–169 to pass it.

Historiography
Scholars of U.S. LGBT history

 Nan Alamilla Boyd
 Michael Bronski
 Julio Capó, Jr.
 Margot Canaday
 David Carter
 Eric Cervini
 George Chauncey
 John D'Emilio
 Madeline Davis
 St. Sukie de la Croix
 Jim Downs
 Martin Duberman
 Lisa Duggan
 Lillian Faderman
 Jules Gill-Peterson
 Lauren Jae Gutterman
 Chad Heap
 Emily K. Hobson
 John Howard
 John Ibson
 David K. Johnson
 Jonathan Ned Katz
 Elizabeth Lapovsky Kennedy
 James Kirchick
 Regina Kunzel
 Eithne Luibhéid
 Jen Manion
 Esther Newton
 Horacio Roque Ramírez
 Will Roscoe
 Leila Rupp
 Clare Sears
 Emily Skidmore
 Siobhan Somerville
 C. Riley Snorton
 Dean Spade
 Marc Stein
 Susan Stryker
 Stuart Timmons
 Timothy Winter-Stewart

See also 

 Biphobia
 Bisexuality in the United States
 History of gay men in the United States
 History of homosexuality in American film
 History of lesbianism in the United States
 History of transgender people in the United States
 Homophobia
 Lesbophobia
 LGBT demographics of the United States
 LGBT historic places in the United States
 List of LGBT actions in the United States prior to the Stonewall riots

History by state 
 LGBT history in California
 LGBT history in Florida
 LGBT history in Hawaii
 LGBT history in Illinois
 LGBT history in Louisiana
 LGBT history in Michigan
 LGBT history in New York
 LGBT history in North Dakota
 LGBT history in South Dakota
 LGBT history in Texas

Explanatory notes

References

Further reading 
  Includes coverage of the lavender scare.

External links 

 Timeline: Milestones in the American Gay Rights Movement at PBS

 
LGBT history by country